John Cross may refer to:

Politicians
John Kynaston Cross (1832–1887), British politician
John Cross (fl. 1402), MP for Guildford
John Michael Cross (1859–1934), journalist and member of the Queensland Legislative Assembly

Others
John Cross (artist) (1819–1861), English painter
John Cross (footballer) (1881–1954), Scottish footballer
John Cross (rugby league) (born 1972), Australian rugby league footballer
John Cross Jr. (1925–2007), American pastor
John H. Cross (1925–2010), American parasitologist

See also
John Crosse (disambiguation)
John of the Cross (1542–1591), Spanish mystic, Catholic saint, Carmelite friar and priest
John Joseph of the Cross (1654–1739), Italian saint